The D Cut is a 2020 Canadian television series on Crave co-written by Audrey Dwyer and Wendy Litner and directed by D.W. Waterson. The show stars Marie Marolle as D, a young hairstylist running a queer hair salon.

Plot 
The D Cut follows self-taught hairstylist D, who runs a hair salon in the back of Mum's bike shop. D must rally a young queer community to help save their hair salon. D's new client, Viva, is introduced as a possible love interest for D.

Cast and characters 

 Marie Marolle as D
 Marlee Walchuk as Mum
 Libby Osler as Quinn
 Vlad Alexis as Liam
 Amrit Kaur as Viva

Episodes

Background and production 
The D Cut was produced by Dove Hair and Unilever Entertainment in partnership with Shaftesbury Films. The first season was shot in Toronto over the span of four days. The D Cut premiered on Crave on June 26, 2020, to coincide with Pride Month. It had a second premiere shortly after on KindaTV, Shaftesbury Films's LGBTQ2S+-centred YouTube channel. The show was directed by D.W. Waterson.

Development and writing 
The D Cut was co-written by Audrey Dwyer and Wendy Litner and was inspired by the true story of a hairstylist from Montreal who ran a hair salon in the back of a bike shop. The real hair salon worked on a pay-what-you-can basis. Dwyer and Litner were paired together by Shaftesbury Films to work on the series.

Awards and nominations

References

External links 

 

2020 Canadian television series debuts
2020s Canadian LGBT-related television series
Television shows filmed in Toronto
Canadian LGBT-related web series